The Montreal Manic or the Manic de Montréal were a professional soccer team based in Montreal, Quebec, Canada, that played in the North American Soccer League. The Montreal Manic were brought back in 2020 by Canadian businessman Gary Gaul as an academy with boys and girls from U5 – U23.

History
"Le Manic" as they were called by the locals, were Montreal's first professional soccer team since the NASL's Montreal Olympique folded in 1973. The team was named after a river in northeast Quebec, the Manicouagan, the site of a massive hydroelectric project.

The Montreal Manic competed from 1981 to 1983, with their home field being the Montreal Olympic Stadium. Previous to Montreal, the team played as the Philadelphia Fury from 1978 through 1980 and ten Fury players as well as manager Eddie Firmani moved to Montreal for 1981.

After defeating the Los Angeles Aztecs in the first round of the 1981 NASL playoffs, the Manic faced the Chicago Sting. An Olympic Stadium crowd of 58,542 (the largest-ever to see an NASL playoff game outside the Cosmos' Giants Stadium) saw the Manic defeat the Sting in the opening match before the series shifted to Chicago where the Manic lost twice and were eliminated. In 1982 the Manic performed better in the regular season than in 1981, but lost in the first round of the playoffs to the Fort Lauderdale Strikers and Firmani was fired.

In 1983 the interest in the team and the average attendance fell sharply. The Manic's opening home match in 1983 versus the Tampa Bay Rowdies was witnessed by just 6,460 fans.
However, in their final season, the Manic produced one of the great shocks in NASL history by eliminating the New York Cosmos in the quarterfinals of the 1983 playoffs, winning the first match away 4–2 and winning the second match at home in a shootout. The Manic then lost to the Tulsa Roughnecks in the next round.

In the 1983 season, the Manic hosted Nottingham Forest (a 4–3 extra time loss) and FC Nantes (a 2–1 shootout victory for Montreal) at the Olympic Stadium.

In his book, Soccer in a Football World, North American soccer historian Dave Wangerin partially attributes the downfall of the Manic organization to the Molson ownership's declaration to attempt to build a Team Canada roster for the 1984 season. The new direction of the team meant many of the team's players who originated from foreign countries would be let go, to emphasize an all Canadian roster instead.  Given that Canada had a relatively poor track record at producing world class soccer talent, Montreal fans were likely put off by the prospect that the quality of the team's play would instantly diminish for the 1984 season.
More importantly, the team was allegedly in financial trouble despite the fact that the Manic had some of the highest attendances in the NASL.  Reports indicated that during the first two seasons, the Manic lacked profitability as they had lost $7 million.  Manic president Roger Samson blamed the losses on bad stadium deals, high rents, having the concession profits going directly to the Montreal Expos, a lack of a television deal, and that an average attendance of over 20,000 was insufficient to keep the franchise solvent.

Year-by-year

Honours

NASL championships
 none

NASL Indoor championships
 1983 (runner-up)

Division titles
 1981–82 Eastern Division, Atlantic Conference (indoor)

Indoor Leading Goal Scorer
 1983 Dale Mitchell 12 goals

Indoor Leading Goalkeeper
 1983 Mehdi Cerbah (GAA: 4.36, GA: 24)

Indoor Tournament Defensive MVP
 1983 Mehdi Cerbah

All-Star first team selections
 1981 Gordon Hill

All-Star second team selections
 1983 Frantz Mathieu

Indoor All-Stars
 1981–82 Gordon Hill (Atlantic Conference)

Canadian Soccer Hall of Fame
 2001 Gerry Gray
 2002 Dale Mitchell
 2008 John McGrane
 2014 Carmine Marcantonio

U.S. Soccer Hall of Fame
 2003 Alan Willey
 2007 Bobby Smith

Indoor Soccer Hall of Fame
 2012 Victor Nogueira
 2013 Brian Quinn
 2014 Dale Mitchell

Notable Players

Head coaches
   Eddie Firmani 1981–1982
  Pierre Mindru interim (1982)
  Andy Lynch (1983)

See also
Montreal Olympique
Montreal Supra
Montreal Impact (1992–2011)
CF Montreal
Philadelphia Fury (1978–80)

References

External links
 History of the Montreal Manic, from loop48.com
Montreal Manic FA

Association football clubs established in 1981
Association football clubs disestablished in 1983
Canadian indoor soccer teams
Defunct soccer clubs in Canada
North American Soccer League (1968–1984) teams
North American Soccer League (1968–1984) teams based in Canada
Man
Soccer clubs in Quebec
1981 establishments in Quebec
1983 disestablishments in Quebec